Skilled Mechanics is a studio album by English trip hop artist Tricky. It was released on 22 January 2016 via False Idols/!K7 Records. It features contributions from Luke Harris, DJ Milo, Ann Dao, Francesca Belmonte, Han Xingzhou, Ivy 艾菲, Oh Land, Renata "Xdare" Platon and Wim Janssens.

Critical reception

Skilled Mechanics was met with generally favorable reviews from critics. At Metacritic, which assigns a normalized rating out of 100 to reviews from mainstream publications, the album received an average score of 68 based on nine reviews.

Track listing

Charts

References

External links

2016 albums
Tricky (musician) albums